Alexander Shvetsov (born September 29, 1988) is a Russian professional ice hockey forward who currently plays with Tsen Tou Jilin City in the Supreme Hockey League (VHL).

Shvetsov previously played in the Kontinental Hockey League for Metallurg Novokuznetsk, Spartak Moscow and Sibir Novosibirsk.

References

External links

1988 births
Living people
Beibarys Atyrau players
People from Cherepovets
Metallurg Novokuznetsk players
Molot-Prikamye Perm players
Rubin Tyumen players
Russian ice hockey right wingers
Saryarka Karagandy players
HC Sibir Novosibirsk players
HC Spartak Moscow players
Tsen Tou Jilin City players
Yermak Angarsk players
Sportspeople from Vologda Oblast